Russellville is an unincorporated community in Boone County, Illinois, United States. Russellville is southeast of Poplar Grove.

References

Unincorporated communities in Boone County, Illinois
Unincorporated communities in Illinois